VK Budva (full name: Vaterpolo klub Budva) is a professional water polo club based in Budva, Montenegro. As of 2021–22 season, it competes in the Montenegrin League and Regional League A1.

Names
It was formerly known as SD VK Mogren between 1947 and 1992, and as PVK Budvanska Rivijera between 1992 and 2008. In 2008, it changed its name to VK Budva.

History
It was established in 1946. In 2008 VK Budva started to participate in the Adriatic Water Polo League. It played in the Final four of Water Polo Euroleague in 2011 and finished 4th.

Rosters

Current squad
 Dejan Lazović                                 2.00 m
 Marko Vukmirović                              1.86 m                        
 Savo Ćetković                                 1.94 m             
 Bogdan Đurđić                                1.84 m  
 Branko Franeta                             1.88 m 
 Sergej Lobov                                  1.92 m 
 Igor Zubac                                    1.93 m   
 Danilo Dragović                               1.74 m
 Dimitrije Rašković                              1.87m                            
  Petar Ćetković      
 Nikola Milardović                                                        
Head coach:  Drago Pejaković

Notable players
 Veljko Uskoković 
     Aleksandar Ćirić 
 Darko Brguljan
 Milan Tičić
 Denis Šefik 
 Nikola Vukčević
 Dragan Drašković 
 Filip Trajković
 Predrag Jokić
 Damjan Danilović
 Petar Ivošević
     Slavko Gak
     Igor Milanović
     Aleksandar Šoštar
     Goran Rađenović
  Damir Crepulja
     Marino Franičević
    Petar Trbojević 
   Srđan Antonijević 
   Fran Paškvalin 
 Aleksandar Radanović 
 Miloš Krivokapić 
 Dragan Vujević 
 Josh Samuels

Recent seasons

Rankings in Montenegrin First League

In European competition

References

External links

Budva
Budva